Neodymium(III) phosphate is an inorganic compound, with the chemical formula of NdPO4. Its hemihydrate can be obtained by the reaction of neodymium(III) chloride and phosphoric acid; its anhydrous form can be obtained by the reaction of silicon pyrophosphate (SiP2O7) and neodymium(III) fluoride. It reacts with calcium pyrophosphate to obtain Ca9Nd(PO4)7.

References 

Neodymium compounds
Phosphates